Battle-Pieces and Aspects of the War (1866) is the first book of poetry published by the American author Herman Melville. The volume is dedicated "To the Memory of the Three Hundred Thousand Who in the War For the Maintenance of the Union Fell Devotedly Under the Flag of Their Fathers" and its 72 poems deal with the battles and personalities of the American Civil War and their aftermath. Also included are Notes and a Supplement in prose in which Melville sets forth his thoughts on how the Post-war Reconstruction should be carried out.

Critics at the time were at best respectful and often sharply critical of Melville's unorthodox style. The book had sold only 486 copies by 1868 and recovered barely half of its publications costs. Not until the latter half of the twentieth century did Battle-Pieces become regarded as one of the most important group of poems on the Civil War.

The poems and their background
The book is Melville's return to poetry after a hiatus which began in 1860 when Harper & Brothers turned down a book of his poems, which is now lost. After moving his family from Massachusetts to New York in 1863, Melville contemplated writing a book of poems on the war, but evidently did not begin to do so until 1864. The book was not published until 1866, a year after the end of the war. The title refers to the familiar paintings by Dutch and British artists who depicted scenes of battle at sea and musical settings of these battles. Melville's major source for the poems were the early volumes of Frank Moore's (compiler) eleven-volume The Rebellion Record: A Diary of American Events, with Documents, Narratives, Illustrative Incidents, Poetry, Etc. (New York:G.P. Putnam, 1861-1868).

Battle-Pieces is made up of 72 short lyric and narrative poems grouped into two sections. The first and longer sequence is centered on battles, but the emphasis is on taking stock of the results and on the personalities of the officers who led them. The second, shorter series is made up of elegies, epitaphs, and requiems.

The opening poem is "The Portent", a meditation on the hanging of the abolitionist John Brown:

Hanging from the beam,
Slowly swaying (such the law),
Gaunt the shadow on your green,
Shenandoah!
The cut is on the crown
(Lo, John Brown),
And the stabs shall heal no more.

Hidden in the cap
Is the anguish none can draw;
So your future veils its face,
Shenandoah!
But the streaming beard is shown
(Weird John Brown),
The meteor of the war.

Other poems include "A Requiem For Soldiers Lost In Ocean Transports", "The Martyr Indicative of the Passion of the People on the 15th of April 1865", "The Frenzy In The Wake Sherman's Advance Through The Carolinas", "The March To The Sea", "Look-Out Mountain The Night Fight", "Shiloh A Requiem", "A Utilitarian View Of The Monitor's Fight", "The Conflict Of Convictions" and  "On the Slain at Chickamauga".

In the prose "Supplement", Melville says that he is "one who never was a blind adherent" and advocates reconciliation with the South. He does not favor enfranchising former slaves immediately, for they are "in their infant pupilage to freedom" and argues that sympathy for them "should not be allowed to exclude kindliness to communities who stand closer to us in nature". He continues, "Let us be Christians toward our fellow-whites, we well as philanthropists toward the blacks, our fellow-men."

Lawrence Buell notes that Melville wrote from a Yankee viewpoint but that Battle-Pieces seldom voices jingoism or triumphalism.

The Martyr
"The Martyr" is Melville's reaction to the assassination of Abraham Lincoln in 1866, one year after the event. Melville praises Lincoln in Christ-like terms calling him "the Forgiver", but predicts that his assassination will cause the forgiver to be replaced by the avenger.

Prose Supplement 
The Supplement in prose is Melville's meditation on the period after the Civil War, now known as the Reconstruction Era. As the scholar Robert L. Gale summarizes, "Melville urges Christian charity and common sense with respect to Reconstruction efforts, a wide and humane patriotism, an awareness that victory came to the North not by greater heroism but because of greater resources and population, sympathy for the liberated slaves, and decency in Congress."

Critical response

The initial reception in the major journals was sympathetic but not entirely approving. Richard Henry Stoddard, for instance, wrote

The habit of his mind is not lyric, but historical, and the genre of historic poetry in which he most congenially expatiates finds rhythm not a help but a hindrance. The exigencies of rhyme hamper him still more, and against both of these trammels his vigorous thought habitually recalcitrates.... That it is not the nature of his thought which is at fault, may be plainly perceived from multitudes of strong and beautiful images, many thoughts picturesquely put, which, belonging legitimately to the poetic domain, still refuse to obey the rigid regimental order of the stanza, but outly its lines, deployed as irregular, though brilliant skirmishers....

Stoddard also found it

a book which, without having one poem of entire artistic ensemble in it, possesses numerous passages of beauty and power. For these it is well worth going through, and belongs, at any rate, to a place on the shelves of those who are collecting the literature of the war, as well as of that much larger class who would not be without a book of Typee'''s gifted author.

More recent critics praise Melville's poetry in general and Battle-Pieces in particular. Lawrence Buell writes that, next to Walt Whitman, Melville wrote the best series of Civil War lyrics.

Editions
  foreword by James M. McPherson; introduction by Richard H. Cox and Paul M. Dowling; interpretive essays by Helen Vendler et al.
 

 Notes 

References and further reading
  in Cambridge Companion to Melville, Robert Levine, ed, Cambridge, Cambridge University Press. 
  Ch XI in Published Poems: The Writings of Herman Melville, Northwestern-Newberry Edition Volume 11, edited by Robert Ryan, Northwestern University Press, Evanston, 2006.
 Olsen-Smith, Steven (2015). "Introduction" and "Chronology." [https://books.google.com/books?id=OCv2CAAAQBAJ&dq=robert+milder+knowing+melville+olsen-smith&pg=PA193 in His Own Time: A Biographical Chronicle of His Life, Drawn from Recollection,  Interviews, and Memoirs by Family, Friends, and Associates.] Edited by Steven Olsen-Smith. Iowa City: University of Iowa Press.

External links 
 
 
 Battle-Pieces and Aspects of the War at the Melville Electronic Library: A Digital Archive Photographs of Melville's own editions with post-publication revisions and corrections in his hand
 Battle-Pieces and Aspects of the War at The Life and Works of Herman Melville 
Text and photorepoduction at Internet Archive.
 
 The Rebellion Record, published by David Van Nostrand, is the major source for the poetry. Each of its twelve volumes reported on the American Civil War with a diary of events, documents, narratives, and poems.
Volume 1 (1861) Introductory address by Edward Everett
Volume 2
Volume 3
Volume 4
Volume 5
Volume 8
Volume 9

1866 books
American poetry collections
Poetry by Herman Melville